Bread Alone is a 1980 album by singer/multi-instrumentalist Walter "Junie" Morrison. The album was released by Columbia Records and was produced by Walter "Junie" Morrison for J.S. Theracon Productions. It was the first solo album released while simultaneously preparing to depart from Parliament-Funkadelic, where he served as keyboardist, co-writer and co-producer. The album features vocal support from Lynn Mabry, formerly of the Brides of Funkenstein.

Bread Alone was reissued through the Sony Music Special Products series in 1991, but went out of print shortly thereafter. in 2011 it was reissued in the U.K. by Cherry Red Records imprint BBR and in the U.S. by Funky Town Grooves as a "two-fer" with his next chronological release Junie 5.

Track listing
"Love Has Taken Me Over (Be My Baby)" (John Tinsley, Walter Morrison, Shermon Singleton) - 4:02
"Why?" (John Tinsley, Walter Morrison, Shermon Singleton)
"Bread Alone" (John Tinsley, Shermon Singleton) - 4:28
"Nagual's Theme" (Walter Morrison) - 1:09
"Funky Parts" (Walter Morrison, Lynn Mabry, Shermon Singleton) - 4:29
"Seaman First Class (Jock Rock)" (Akasha Morrison, Walter Morrison, Lynn Mabry) - 7:59
"Apple Song" (Walter Morrison) 4:01

Personnel
Walter "Junie" Morrison - lead vocals
Lynn Mabry, Teresa Allman, Brenda Henderson, Akasha Morrison - backing vocals
Wes "Duck Army" Boatman - synthesizer programming
All instruments performed by Walter "Junie" Morrison
Technical
Gary Platt - engineer, mixing

References

1980 albums
Walter Morrison albums
Columbia Records albums